Mika's Aroha Mardi Gras was a 2011 concert show by Mika Haka. It was staged in Takutai Square, Auckland CBD, New Zealand on September 23 with two shows on the same day. The show was part of the New Zealand series of entertainment events that was put on for the 2011 Rugby World Cup. In mid October, Māori Television aired the concerts as a one-hour special. The show was edited from footage of the second performance of the evening. 

The shows were a free non ticketed event available to the public. Combining both 6pm and 8pm shows, a total of 15,000 attended the event. The show had over 680 people participating in the event, including 400 kids as part of the KA 400. The event was choreographed by Jay Tewake.

Rena Owen was the presenter of the Televised special, presenting the show as a story teller. Mika also performed alongside Jay Tewake, Edward Ru of Sweet & Irie,  Keisha Castle-Hughes, Erakah and more.

Maori TV Setlist

Concert dates

Personnel

Lead performer
Vocals, dance and choreographer: Mika Haka

Additional performers
Vocals: Jay Tewake, Edward Ru,  Keisha Castle-Hughes, Erakah and more. 

Music department
Musical director: Karl Moser

Choreographer
Choreographer and dancer: Jay Tewake

Revised events

2014 Legend Bar

In 2014, Mika Haka recreated his Mika's Aroha Mardi Gras as part of the New Zealand Auckland Pride Festival. This time it was a smaller event held in a bar called Legend Gay Bar. The event was held on the 6 February 2014 Waitangi Day. The aim of the event was not only to shine a light on upcoming New Zealand talent but to also release his single Dress To Express featuring Zakk d’Larté and Hannah Martin.

Set List

The Red Light District

In 2016, Mika once again recreated Aroha Mardi Gras. The event was held on Karangahape Road in Auckland CBD outside the infamous Auckland Gay bar Family. The event was held between 12pm and went on till 7 pm, which is a similar schedule to the Big Gay Out. The event was free to the public. This was the first time in 20 year that Karangahape Road has closed down for an event. Parts of the event was filmed for the reality TV series Queens of Panguru where Ramon Te Wake, Jay Tewake, and Maihi Makiha all performed.

Set List

References

External links
 
 Official Website
 Eventfinda Website

Music television specials
2011 in New Zealand television